Adventure's End is a 1937 American adventure film directed by Arthur Lubin and starring John Wayne and Diana Gibson. It was distributed by Universal Pictures. The film is considered lost, as no prints are known to exist.

Premise
Duke Slade, a Pacific islands pearl diver, signs up to sail on a whaling vessel. Before they sail, Captain Drew marries Slade to his daughter Janet, to protect him against his first mate, Rand Husk. When the crew mutinies at sea, Slade sides with the captain.

Cast
 John Wayne as Duke Slade
 Diana Gibson as Janet Drew
 Montagu Love as Capt. Abner Drew
 Moroni Olsen as First Mate Rand Husk
 Maurice Black as Blackie
 Paul White as Kalo
 Cameron Hall as Slivers
 Patrick J. Kelly as Matt
 George Cleveland as Tom
 William Sundholm as Chips
 James T. Mack as Hooten
 Britt Wood as Hardy, Old Sailor
 Ben Carter as Stantul, Black Sailor
 Wally Howe as Kierce
 Jimmie Lucas as Flench, Black Cabin Boy
 Glenn Strange as Barzeck

Production
Adventure's End was the last of six films John Wayne made at Universal. Four of them were directed by Arthur Lubin who later recalled they usually "had six days to shoot. There was no time schedule, as there is today, where if you go late at night or start early in the morning, you have to pay more. In those days, you could shoot twenty-four hours a day." Lubin says that Adventure's End was  "very extravagant", because "we were going to shoot in ten days", and "it was going to be a big picture." He says Wayne films were often inspired by "What sets are up these days that we can make pictures on, that won’t cost us much money". Adventure's End was made because "there was a boat on Universal lot, and they could use that."

In November 1936 Trem Carr purchased Maid of Orleans, a 150-foot schooner, one of the last of the whaling ships on the west coast, in Vancouver. He purchased specifically for the film. Filming was postponed due to a shipping strike (other films affected by this strike include The Hurricane for Sam Goldwyn and Short Haul also starring Wayne at Universal). By February the strike was over and the film was officially on Universal's production slate; Carr sent a crew to Vancouver to sail the boat to Los Angeles.

Filming started early July 1937.

Reception
The New York Times called the film a "pale reflection of several recent Hollywood sea epics."

See also
 John Wayne filmography

References

External links

Adventure's End at BFI
Adventure's End at Letterbox DVD

1937 films
1937 drama films
1930s adventure drama films
American adventure drama films
American black-and-white films
1930s English-language films
Films about whaling
Films directed by Arthur Lubin
Films set in Oceania
Films set in the Pacific Ocean
Films set on islands
Universal Pictures films
1930s American films